Center for Strategic Research is a leading Iranian think tank on strategy issues. It is the research arm of the Expediency Discernment Council. The last head of organization was Ali Akbar Velayati who replaced former head Hassan Rouhani, the former President of Iran. It was established in 1989.
It publishes Foreign Relations Quarterly, Rahbord (Strategy)  in Persian and Iranian Review of Foreign Affairs in English.

Departments
The CSR has six affiliated departments:
 Foreign Policy Research Department (This department publishes 3 journals: Pazhouhesh (Research), Gozaresh Tahlili (Analytical Report) and Gahnameh (Periodical Bulletin))
 International Relations Research Department (This department publishes Gozaresh Rahbordi (Strategic Report)) 
 Economic Research Department (This department publishes Gozaresh-e Pazhouheshhay-e Eqtesadi (Economic Research Report))  
 Cultural Research Department (This department publishes Gozareshat-e Rahbordi (Strategic Reports))
 Legal Research and Jurisprudential Studies Department (Publication: Gozaresh-e Rahbordi (Strategic Report))
 Executive and Information Department

People
Presidents
 Mohammad Mousavi Khoeiniha (1989–1992)
 Hassan Rouhani (1992–2013)
 Ali Akbar Velayati (2013–2017)
Researchers

 Saeed Hajjarian

References

External links
 Official website

Political research institutes
1989 establishments in Iran
Research institutes established in 1989
Research institutes in Iran
Former research institutes
Think tanks based in Iran
2017 disestablishments in Iran
Research institutes disestablished in 2017